Khalifeh Kandi may refer to:
 Khalifeh Kandi, Hashtrud, East Azerbaijan Province
 Khalifeh Kandi, Maragheh, East Azerbaijan Province
 Khalifeh Kandi-ye Hatam, East Azerbaijan Province
 Khalifeh Kandi, Markazi